Pasiphila kumakurai is a moth in the family Geometridae. It is found in Japan.

References

Moths described in 1958
kumakurai
Moths of Japan